Tony Jones Jr. (born November 24, 1997) is an American football running back for the Seattle Seahawks of the National Football League (NFL). He played college football at Notre Dame.

Early years
Jones attended St. Petersburg Catholic High School in St. Petersburg, Florida before transferring to IMG Academy in Bradenton, Florida. He played baseball and football in high school. As a senior in football, he had 78 carries for 514 yards and 11 touchdowns. Jones played in the 2015 U.S. Army All-American Bowl. He committed to the University of Notre Dame to play college football.

College career
Jones did not see the field as a true freshman in 2016. As a redshirt freshman at Notre Dame in 2017, Jones played in 12 games and had 44 carries for 232 yards and three touchdowns. As a redshirt sophomore in 2018, he played in 13 games and had 392 rushing yards and three touchdowns. Jones took over as the starting running back his redshirt junior year in 2019. He missed a game and a half due to cartilage damage in his ribs suffered during a loss to Michigan. Jones graduated in December and announced that he would not return to Notre Dame for his fifth year, in order to enter the 2020 NFL Draft.

In the 2019 Camping World Bowl, Jones had a 84 yard touchdown run that broke the record for longest run in Notre Dame bowl game history. Jones rushed for 857 yards and six touchdowns in his senior season.

At the end of the season, Jones was selected to play in the 2020 East-West Shrine Game in his hometown of St. Petersburg, Florida.

Professional career

New Orleans Saints
Jones signed with the New Orleans Saints as an undrafted free agent on April 27, 2020. He was waived during final roster cuts on September 5, 2020, and re-signed to the team's practice squad the next day. He was elevated to the active roster on January 2, 2021, for the team's week 17 game against the Carolina Panthers, and reverted to the practice squad after the game. On January 18, 2021, Jones signed a reserve/futures contract with the Saints. On September 2, 2021, Jones made the 53-man roster for the Saints after rushing 106 yards on 12 carries and one touchdown, along with 42 receiving yards on six receptions in two preseason games. He suffered an ankle injury in Week 4 and was placed on injured reserve on October 6, 2021. He was activated on November 20.

On October 8, 2022, Jones was waived by the Saints.

Seattle Seahawks
On October 10, 2022, Jones was claimed off waivers by the Seattle Seahawks. He was waived on December 21 and signed to the practice squad on December 26. He was promoted to the active roster on January 13, 2023.

Personal life
Jones' father Tony Jones Sr. was a fullback and linebacker for Illinois State, as well as the Cleveland Thunderbolts, Tampa Bay Storm, and Buffalo Destroyers of the Arena Football League.

At Notre Dame, Jones majored in Film, Television and Theatre. During the 2019 college football season, Jones filmed his first film, a short film entitled "Come Together" written and directed with classmate Conor Fitzgerald, starring football teammate Ovie Oghoufo and fellow FTT student and stage actress Teagan Earley. The short film premiered at the 2020 Sundial Film Festival in Redding, California.

References

External links
Notre Dame Fighting Irish football bio
New Orleans Saints football bio
Sports References Statistics

1997 births
Living people
American football running backs
New Orleans Saints players
Notre Dame Fighting Irish football players
Players of American football from St. Petersburg, Florida
Seattle Seahawks players